Samereh may refer to:
 Samereh-ye Olya
 Samereh-ye Sofla